Maja Pohar Perme (born 8 April 1976) is a Slovenian former badminton player affiliated with Olimpija club. She competed at the 2000 Summer Olympics in Sydney, Australia. Her brother Andrej Pohar also a professional badminton player, and the duo played in the mixed doubles event. She won 33 times National Championships title, 10 in the women's singles, 9 in the women's doubles, and 14 in the mixed doubles event.

Pohar received her Master of Statistics and Ph.D. in University of Ljubljana. She is an associate professor of Biostatistics at the Medical faculty of the University of Ljubljana and teaches both medical students as well as statistics students at masters and PhD level. As statistician, she is the co-editor of the Slovenian Medical Journal.

Achievements

IBF International 
Women's singles

Women's doubles

Mixed doubles

References

External links 
 
 

1976 births
Living people
Sportspeople from Ljubljana
Slovenian female badminton players
Olympic badminton players of Slovenia
Badminton players at the 2000 Summer Olympics
University of Ljubljana alumni
Biostatisticians
Women statisticians